The 1963 Nordic Athletics Championships was the second edition of the international athletics competition between Nordic countries and was held in Gothenburg, Sweden. It consisted of 34 individual athletics events, 22 for men and 12 for women. This covered a track and field programme plus a men's marathon race.

Finland defended its team title in the men's points classification with 225.5 points and Sweden repeated as women's team champions with 104 points. Iceland took part in the men's competition only and was the only nation not to have an athlete top the podium. Among the athletes in attendance were 1962 European Athletics Championships medalists Pentti Nikula, Stig Pettersson, Rainer Stenius and Pentti Eskola.

Ulla-Britt Wieslander of Sweden was the most successful athlete of the tournament, defending both her 100 metres and 200 metres titles as well as adding the 80 metres hurdles championship to her honours. Bengt-Göran Fernström was the only man to win two individual titles, taking the 200 m and 400 metres races. Athletes to successfully defend their 1961 titles were Carl Fredrik Bunæs (100 m), Stig Pettersson (high jump), Stein Haugen (discus), Birger Asplund (hammer), Karen Inge Halkier (shot put) and Nina Hansen (pentathlon).

Medal summary

Men

Women

Points table

Men

Women

References
Nordic Championships. GBR Athletics. Retrieved 2018-04-29.

1961
Nordic Championships
Nordic Championships
International sports competitions in Gothenburg
1960s in Gothenburg
International athletics competitions hosted by Sweden
Athletics in Gothenburg